The 19th Voronezh-Shumlinskaya Red Banner Order of Suvorov and Red Banner of Labor Motor Rifle Division, is a division of the Russian Ground Forces. It appears to have been formed originally in July 1922 at Tambov in the Moscow Military District as a territorial formation. In 1923 it was awarded the 'Tambov' placename and renamed the 19th Voronezh Rifle Division. The division was downsized to a brigade in 2009 and reestablished as a division in 2020.

History 
By the beginning of World War II, the unit consisted of the 32nd, 282nd, and 315th Rifle, 90th Artillery, and the 103rd Howitzer Artillery Regiment. The division entered combat against the Germans on July 19, 1941 near Yelnya as part of the 24th Army of the Western Front. It participated in the Elninskaya offensive, the Battle of Moscow, Rzhev-Vyazma offensive operation in 1942, the Rzhev-Sychevka offensive, Kharkiv defensive operation in 1943, Belgorod-Khar'kov Offensive Operation (3 August 1943 - 23 August 1943).
As part of the 7th Guards Army, it fought in the Poltava-Kremenchuk offensive, the Pyatihatskoy offensive, Bereznegovatoe-Snigirevskaya Offensive, Odessa offensive, at Chisinau, Izmail offensive, Belgrade Offensive 1944 Derskoy offensive, Bratislava–Brno Offensive.

It participated in the liberation of the cities Elnya, Ruza, Krasnograd, Bobrynets, Bratislava, Shumla liberated September 9, 1944. For exemplary performance of command assignments in Bulgaria it was given the honorary name "Shumlinskoy" on 27 September 1944. It crossed the Seversky Donets, Ingulets, Dniester, Prut, Southern Bug, Dnieper, and Danube rivers. During the Belgrade operation in October 1944 the division entered Yugoslavia, and in November, crossed the Danube River near Apatin and in difficult, forested terrain during Battle of Batina led fierce battles with the Nazis on the left bank. In 1944 it fought through Romania, Bulgaria, Yugoslavia, Hungary, and Czechoslovakia, where it ended the war. For its courage in these battles and military skill the division was awarded the Order of Suvorov 2nd degree (January 6, 1945).

During the war it served successively with the 24th, 43rd, 5th, 20th, 3rd Guards Tank, 57th, 37th, 7th Guards, and 46th Armies.

In 1945, the division arrived in the Stavropol Military District and was stationed in Vladikavkaz. In May–June 1946, the division was reorganised into the 11th Separate Rifle Brigade. All battalions of the brigade were stationed in Ordzhonikidze (which was renamed Vladikavkaz in 1990). On 1 July 1949 the 11th Separate Rifle Brigade was reorganised as the 19th Mountain Rifle Division, 12th Mountain Corps. On May 31, 1954, the 19th Mountain Division was renamed the 19th Rifle Division. In March 1957 the 19th Rifle Division was reorganized as the 92nd Motor Rifle Division. According to the USSR Minister of Defense Order No. 00147 of November 17, 1964, in order to preserve the martial traditions, the 92nd Motor Rifle Division was renamed the 19th Motor Rifle Division. Thus in 1965 it became again the 19th Motor Rifle Division.

It arrived in the Caucasus region by the mid-1950s and has been stationed for many years at Vladikavkaz. In the late 1980s it was part of the 42nd Army Corps at Volgograd and consisted of the 397th Tank Regiment, and the 201st, 429th, and 503rd Motor Rifle Regiments.

Today after reshuffling of units during the last fifteen years it is part of the re-formed 58th Army, in the North Caucasus Military District. Division honorifics are - Russian: Воронежско-Шумлинская краснознаменная, орденов Суворова, Трудового Красного Знамени.

On August 8, 2008, elements of the 19th Motor Rifle Division (at least 503rd Motor Rifle Reg.) entered South Ossetia.

In 2009 as part of the wider restructuring of the Russian Ground Forces the division became the 19th Motor Rifle Brigade.

In 2020 19th Motorized Rife Brigade became the 19th Motorized Rifle Division within the 58th Army in the Southern Military District. It was reportedly planned to re-equip the Division with T-90M main battle tanks. The division took part in the 2022 Russian invasion of Ukraine and fought in the Zaporizhzhia Oblast.

Subordinated units

2007 
 429th Motor Rifle Regiment
 503rd Guards Motor Rifle Regiment (equipping with 10 BTR-82A armored personnel carriers as of 2021)
 693rd Guards Motor Rifle Regiment
 292nd Self-propelled Artillery Regiment
 481st Air-Defence Missile Regiment
 141st Tank Battalion
 Engineer Battalion
 Military Intelligence Battalion
 Signal Battalion
 Chemical Battalion
 Supply Battalion
 Maintenance Battalion
 Medical Battalion

Personnel and Equipment 
The 19th Motor Rifle Division currently has approximately 11,000 personnel in active service.

Equipment Summary

Notes 

 
 Michael Holm, 19th Motor Rifle Division

References 
 Michael Avanzini and Craig Crofoot, 'Armies of the Bear'
 Aberjona Press, 'Slaughterhouse: The Handbook of the Eastern Front', 2005

019
019
Military units and formations established in 1965
Military units and formations disestablished in 2009
1922 establishments in Russia
Military units and formations awarded the Order of the Red Banner
Military units and formations of the 2022 Russian invasion of Ukraine